Jimmy Connors was the defending champion, but lost in the semifinals this year.

Vitas Gerulaitis won the title, defeating Mats Wilander 4–6, 7–6, 6–2 in the final.

Seeds

  John McEnroe (quarterfinals, withdrew)
  Jimmy Connors (semifinals)
  Vitas Gerulaitis (champion)
  Brian Teacher (quarterfinals)
  Tim Mayotte (quarterfinals)
  Shlomo Glickstein (semifinals)
  Harold Solomon (first round)
  Bruce Manson (first round)

Draw

Finals

Top half

Bottom half

References

 Main Draw

1982 Grand Prix (tennis)
Donnay Indoor Championships